Agdistis dahurica is a moth of the family Pterophoridae. It is found in the southern steppe regions of the Chita Oblast in Russia.

References

Moths described in 1994
Agdistinae